Janet Ruth Nutter (born April 2, 1953) is a retired diver from Canada, who was supposed to represent her native country at the 1980 Summer Olympics, but failed to do so after the boycott. A resident of Thornhill, Ontario she twice won a medal at the Pan American Games (1975 and 1979), and two medals (gold and bronze) at the 1978 Commonwealth Games.

She was one of four Canadian athletes chosen by director Paul Cowan to appear in the National Film Board of Canada documentary Going the Distance, about the 1978 Games in Edmonton.

Nutter was inducted into the Manitoba Sports Hall of Fame and Museum in 1986.

References

External links 
Janet Nutter’s biography at Manitoba Sports Hall of Fame and Museum
 Canadian Olympic Committee

1953 births
Living people
Canadian female divers
Divers from Montreal
Divers at the 1978 Commonwealth Games
Commonwealth Games gold medallists for Canada
Commonwealth Games bronze medallists for Canada
Pan American Games gold medalists for Canada
Pan American Games bronze medalists for Canada
Commonwealth Games medallists in diving
Pan American Games medalists in diving
Universiade medalists in diving
Divers at the 1975 Pan American Games
Divers at the 1979 Pan American Games
Universiade bronze medalists for Canada
Medalists at the 1977 Summer Universiade
Medalists at the 1975 Pan American Games
Medalists at the 1979 Pan American Games
20th-century Canadian women
Medallists at the 1978 Commonwealth Games